Vadim Sergeyevich Rakov (born 9 January 2005) is a Russian footballer who plays as a forward for FC Lokomotiv Moscow.

Club career
Rakov made his debut in the Russian Premier League for FC Lokomotiv Moscow on 13 August 2022 in a game against PFC Krylia Sovetov Samara.

Career statistics

References

External links
 
 
 
 

Living people
2005 births
Russian footballers
Association football forwards
Russia youth international footballers
Russian Premier League players
FC Lokomotiv Moscow players